Magnús Jónsson (or Magnús prúði, 1530–1591), Icelandic official and poet.

Magnus Jonsson or Magnús Jónsson may also refer to:

 Magnús Jónsson (actor) (born 1965), Icelandic actor, in The Viking Sagas
 Magnus Jonsson (biathlete) (born 1982), Swedish biathlete
 Magnús Jónsson, Earl of Orkney c. 1300–1321
 Magnús Jónsson (law professor), Icelandic law professor and Minister of Finance (1922–1923)
 Magnús Jónsson (Minister for Employment), Icelandic politician and Minister for Employment (1942)
 Magnús Jónsson (Minister of Finance), Icelandic politician and Minister of Finance (1965–1971)
 Megas (Magnús Þór Jónsson, born 1945), Icelandic rock and roll singer and songwriter

See also